Martinus Anthonius Johannes Maria "Martin" Hersman (born 26 February 1974) is a retired speed skater from the Netherlands who was active between 1992 and 2003. He competed at the 1994 and 1998 Winter Olympics in 1000 and 1500 m; his best achievement was sixth place in the 1500 m event in 1998.

He won a bronze allround medal at the European Speed Skating Championships for Men in 1996 and two bronze medals at the single distance world championships: in the 1500 m (1996) and 1000 m (1997). Nationally, he won the 1500 m event in 2000 and 2002.

Personal records

Hersman has a score of 153.199 points on the Adelskalender.

Tournament overview

Source:

Medals won

References

1974 births
Living people
Dutch male speed skaters
Olympic speed skaters of the Netherlands
Speed skaters at the 1994 Winter Olympics
Speed skaters at the 1998 Winter Olympics
People from Teylingen
World Single Distances Speed Skating Championships medalists
Sportspeople from South Holland